The 2011 Copa América was an international football tournament held in Argentina from 1 to 24 July 2011. The twelve national teams involved in the tournament were required to register a squad of 22 players, or 23 players if the team chooses to have three goalkeepers; only players in these squads were eligible to take part in the tournament. Each nation's squad of players will be given shirt numbers 1–23.

Number of caps, goals, players' club teams and players' age as of 1 July 2011 – the tournament's opening day.

Group A

Argentina
Head coach: Sergio Batista

Bolivia
Head coach: Gustavo Quinteros

Colombia
Head coach: Hernán Darío Gómez

Costa Rica
Head coach:  Ricardo La Volpe

Group B

Brazil
Head coach: Mano Menezes

Ecuador
Head coach:  Reinaldo Rueda

Paraguay
Head coach:  Gerardo Martino

Venezuela
Head coach: César Farías

Group C

Chile
Head coach:  Claudio Borghi

Mexico 
Mexico participated in the 2011 Copa América as a U-22 squad.

Head coach: Luis Fernando Tena

Peru
Head coach:  Sergio Markarián

Uruguay
Head coach: Óscar Tabárez

Player statistics
Player representation by club

Player representation by league

Average age of squads

References

External links
Official list of players 

2011 Copa América
2011